This is a list of Supai Group prominences in the Grand Canyon. Landforms with up to 4 units of Supai Group, as prominences.

The rock unit sequences are as follows:
 Coconino Sandstone, (prominence, Permian unit)
 Hermit Shale, Permian
 Supai Group, (4 units, Pennsylvanian-Permian)
 4 – Esplanade Sandstone, (Permian)(Typically forms a resistant (& thick) cliff, thickening in Western Grand Canyon)
 3 – Wescogame Formation
 2 – Manakacha Formation, (a resistant cliff-former; can make cliffs, or cliffs, with a platform on prominence)
 1 – Watahomigi Formation
 (localized-Surprise Canyon Formation)
 Redwall Limestone-cliff-former (and platform-former)

Supai Group (4 units)

Supai Group, Esplanade Sandstone (unit 4)

Supai Group, Manakacha Formation

Supai Group, Watahomigi Formation

Coconino Sandstone cliffs on Supai (#4)-Esplanade Sandstone platform

The cliff-former (and a platform-former) Esplanade Sandstone supports cliffs of Coconino Sandstone, the cliffs being on slope-former Hermit Shale, then the Esplanade Sandstone platform.

 Angels Gate
 Brady Peak
 Jupiter Temple

 Mount Hayden
 Siegfried Pyre
 Tritle Peak

Alphabetical listing

 Cardenas Butte
 Dana Butte
 Geikie Peak
 Scorpion Ridge

 The Howlands Butte
 Thor Temple
 Whites Butte

See also
 Geology of the Grand Canyon area

References

Grand Canyon
Grand Canyon National Park
Maotianshan shales fossils